Evergestis exoticalis is a moth in the family Crambidae. It is found in Colombia and Peru.

References

Moths described in 1875
Evergestis
Moths of South America